NWA 312 is an upcoming professional wrestling pay-per-view (PPV) event promoted by the National Wrestling Alliance (NWA). It will take place on Friday April 7, 2023, at StudioONE in Highland Park, Illinois. The name of the event is in reference to area code 312, the area code of downtown Chicago.

Production

Background
On the February 14, 2023 episode of NWA Powerrr, it was announced that NWA 312 would take place on April 7 in Chicago, Illinois. At the same time the NWA announced they were introducing the NWA Women's Television Championship with a new champion being crowned at the PPV. On March 10, the NWA announced a partnership with tea shop Madame Zuzu's – of which NWA president William Patrick Corgan is a co-owner of – to benefit the Highland Park Community Foundation in support of victims of the Highland Park parade shooting on July 4, 2022.

Storylines
NWA 312 will feature professional wrestling matches that involved different wrestlers from pre-existing scripted feuds and storylines. Wrestlers portrayed heroes, villains, or less distinguishable characters in scripted events that built tension and culminated in a wrestling match or series of matches. The twelfth season of the NWA's weekly flagship program, Powerrr, as well as the sixth season of their secondary program, NWA USA, will feature storylines leading up to the event.

On the June 26, 2022 episode of Powerrr, Madusa announced the creation of the NWA Women's Television Championship. Several months later on the February 14, 2023 Powerrr, with the announcement of NWA 312, it was announced that a tournament will be held to determine the inaugural champion, with the finals set to take place at the event. Qualifying matches will be held over the next several weeks on Powerrr and NWA USA. On the March 14 Powerrr, Kenzie Paige defeated Ashley D'Amboise to advance to the final.

On the February 14 episode of Powerrr, Tyrus successfully defended the NWA Worlds Heavyweight Championship against Rolando Freeman. Although, before his victory, the former was briefly distracted by EC3 standing beside his manager BLK Jeez. The following week, lead announcer Joe Galli interviewed EC3 and BLK Jeez about what transpired, Jeez stated his company name has changed to "Churchs Money Entertainment" and that he has entered into an agreement with EC3's "Control Your Narrative" group, though EC3 simply stated that he was only "controlling his narrative". He later went on to challenge Cyon for the NWA National Championship at NWA 312, which would later be made official.

On the February 28 Powerrr, Chris Adonis and La Rosa Negra announced that they will both utilize their Champions Series title opportunites at NWA 312, challenging NWA Worlds Heavyweight Champion Tyrus and NWA World Women's Champion Kamille, respectively.

On the February 21 Powerrr, Pretty Empowered 2.0 (Ella Envy and Roxy) won the NWA World Women's Tag Team Championship from The Renegade Twins (Charlette and Robyn Renegade). However, shortly after the match, Madi Wrenkowski and Missa Kate utilized the former's Champion Series title opportunity to immediately win the titles from Pretty Empowered. On March 17, the NWA announced that Pretty Empowered will invoke their rematch clause against Wrenkowski and Kate at NWA 312.

Matches

NWA Women's Television Championship inaugural tournament bracket

References

External links

National Wrestling Alliance pay-per-view events
2023 in professional wrestling
2023 in Illinois
Professional wrestling in the Chicago metropolitan area
April 2023 events in the United States
National Wrestling Alliance shows
Scheduled professional wrestling shows